The 1908 Idaho football team represented the University of Idaho in the 1908 college football season.  Idaho was led by second-year head coach John R. Middleton.

Idaho met Utah for the first time, in Salt Lake City on Thanksgiving.

Schedule

 Two games were played on Friday (at Whitman in Walla Walla, at Washington State in Pullman) and one on Thursday (at Utah in Salt Lake City on Thanksgiving)

References

External links
 Gem of the Mountains: 1910 University of Idaho yearbook (spring 1909) – 1908 football season
 Go Mighty Vandals – 1908 football season
 Idaho Argonaut – student newspaper – 1908 editions

Idaho
Idaho Vandals football seasons
Idaho football